San Miguel de Socorro is the Catholic church in Socorro, New Mexico, built on the ruins of the old Nuestra Señora de Socorro mission.  The old mission was built around 1626, but was destroyed  in 1680 during the Pueblo Revolt. A portion of the adobe wall of the old church remains today and still can be seen behind glass just left of the altar.  The building was listed on the National Register of Historic Places in 2016.

San Miguel is administered by the Archdiocese of Santa Fe.

History and legend
According to the San Miguel website, it is the oldest Catholic church in the United States, founded in 1598. Although the village of Socorro was founded at this time, and the Nuestra Senora de Socorro was  built in the 17th century, San Miguel itself was not built until the 19th century. The construction of the church was most likely completed by 1821 when the first church baptisms, burials and marriages were recorded.

Local legend has it that during an Apache raid, an angel appeared and scared off the invaders. Parishioners thus decided to name the church after St. Michael, the archangel who supposedly saved  the village.

The last Mexican governor of New Mexico, Manuel Armijo, is buried at the church.

See also

National Register of Historic Places listings in Socorro County, New Mexico

Footnotes

External links
 Old San Miguel Mission - official site

Miguel de Socorro
Miguel de Socorro
Buildings and structures in Socorro County, New Mexico
Miguel de Socorro
Tourist attractions in Socorro County, New Mexico
History of Socorro County, New Mexico
Socorro, New Mexico
National Register of Historic Places in Socorro County, New Mexico
Churches on the National Register of Historic Places in New Mexico